The meridian 150° west of Greenwich is a line of longitude that extends from the North Pole across the Arctic Ocean, North America (entirely within the State of Alaska), the Pacific Ocean, the Southern Ocean, and Antarctica to the South Pole.

In Antarctica, the meridian defines the eastern limit of New Zealand's territorial claim. The land further east is not claimed by any nation except the micronation of Westarctica, which is not recognized by any UN member state.

The 150th meridian west forms a great circle with the 30th meridian east.

The Hawaii-Aleutian Time Zone and Line Islands Time Zone is based on the mean solar time of this meridian.

From Pole to Pole
Starting at the North Pole and heading south to the South Pole, the 150th meridian west passes through:

{| class="wikitable plainrowheaders"
! scope="col" width="130" | Co-ordinates
! scope="col" | Country, territory or sea
! scope="col" | Notes
|-
| style="background:#b0e0e6;" | 
! scope="row" style="background:#b0e0e6;" | Arctic Ocean
| style="background:#b0e0e6;" |
|-
| style="background:#b0e0e6;" | 
! scope="row" style="background:#b0e0e6;" | Beaufort Sea
| style="background:#b0e0e6;" |
|-
| 
! scope="row" | 
| Alaska - passing through Anchorage (at )
|-valign="top"
| style="background:#b0e0e6;" | 
! scope="row" style="background:#b0e0e6;" | Pacific Ocean
| style="background:#b0e0e6;" | Passing just east of Caroline Island,  (at ) Passing just west of Moorea island,  (at )
|-
| style="background:#b0e0e6;" | 
! scope="row" style="background:#b0e0e6;" | Southern Ocean
| style="background:#b0e0e6;" |
|-valign="top"
| 
! scope="row" | Antarctica
|-
|}

See also
149th meridian west
151st meridian west

w150 meridian west
Borders of New Zealand